"Stone Cold" is a song by British rock band Rainbow. It was released as a single in 1982 from their album Straight Between the Eyes.

Chart performance
The song reached the Top 40 on the Billboard Hot 100, peaking at number 40 on June 19, 1982, and spent 12 weeks on the chart. This was the band's only top 40 song in the United States. It also topped the Billboard Top Rock Tracks on June 5, 1982.

See also
List of Billboard Mainstream Rock number-one songs of the 1980s

Sources

1982 songs
1982 singles
Rainbow (rock band) songs
Polydor Records singles
Songs written by Ritchie Blackmore
Songs written by Roger Glover